Ernesto Cesàro (12 March 1859 – 12 September 1906) was an Italian mathematician who worked in the field of differential geometry. He wrote a book, Lezioni di geometria intrinseca (Naples, 1890), on this topic, in which he also describes fractal, space-filling curves, partly covered by the larger class of de Rham curves, but are still known today in his honor as Cesàro curves. He is known also for his 'averaging' method for the 'Cesàro-summation' of divergent series, known as the Cesàro mean.

Biography

After a rather disappointing start of his academic career and a journey through Europe - with the most important stop at Liège, where his older brother Giuseppe Raimondo Pio Cesàro was teaching mineralogy at the local university - Ernesto Cesàro graduated from the University of Rome in 1887, while he was already part of the Royal Science Society of Belgium for the numerous works that he had already published.

The following year, he obtained a mathematics chair at the University of Palermo, which he kept until 1891. He settled in Rome, where he stayed as a professor at the Sapienza University until his accidental death, while trying to rescue his youngest son Manlio from drowning.

Work 

Cesàro's main contributions are in the field of differential geometry. Lessons of intrinsic geometry, written in 1894, explains in particular the construction of a fractal curve. After that, Cesàro also studied the "snowflake curve" of von Koch, continuous but not differentiable in any of its points. 

Among his other works are Introduction to the mathematical theory of infinitesimal calculus (1893), Algebraic analysis (1894), Elements of infinitesimal calculus (1897). He proposed a possible definition of a divergent sequence, known today as "Cesàro's sum," given by the limit of the mean of the sequence partial terms' sum.

Books by E. Cesàro
 Lezioni di geometria intrinseca (Naples, 1896)  (trans. into German under the title Vorlesungen über natürliche Geometrie; 1901, 1st edn.; 1926, 2nd edn. trans. and with an appendix by Gerhard Kowalewski)
 Elementi di calcolo infinitesimale con numerose applicazioni geometriche (L. Alvano, Naples, 1905) 
 Corso di analisi algebrica con introduzione al calcolo infinitesimale (Bocca, Torino, 1894)

See also
 Stolz–Cesàro theorem
 Cesàro's theorem
 Cesàro equation
 Cesàro mean
 Cesàro summation
 Cesàro curve
 Lévy C curve

Notes

External links

1859 births
1906 deaths
Scientists from Naples
19th-century Italian mathematicians
20th-century Italian mathematicians
Differential geometers
Deaths by drowning
Academic staff of the Sapienza University of Rome
University of Liège alumni
Sapienza University of Rome alumni
Academic staff of the University of Palermo